Carl Ahasver von Sinner (February 2, 1754 – April 25, 1821) was a Bernese architect of the Louis XVI period.

Biography 
Born in Sumiswald as the son of governor (Landvogt) Johann Bernhard von Sinner, he married Maria Susanna Zeerleder in 1780. He was a member of the Grand Council of Bern, in 1795 and head magistrate (Oberamtmann) of Schwarzenburg from 1803 to 1805.

As an architect, he is noted for the palace of Lohn, now the country estate of the Swiss Federal Council; the Kleehof in Kirchberg and the estate of Hofwil in Münchenbuchsee.

Buildings 
 Landsitz Lohn, Kehrsatz, 1782 – 1783
 Tschiffeligut (Kleehof), Kirchberg, Bern,  reconstruction  1783
 Clergy house, Ammerswil, 1783
 Amtshaus (official residence), Aarau, 1784 – 1787
 Hofwil, Münchenbuchsee, 1784 – 1786
 Schloss Rued, Schlossrued 1792 – 1796
 Ortbühl, Steffisburg, 1794
 Gasthof Ochsen, Schöftland, 1798
 Urechhaus (a three-story classicist house), Othmarsingen
 Müllerhaus, Lenzburg, 1780

References 

1754 births
1821 deaths
Swiss architects
Swiss nobility